is the chairman of Acom Co., Ltd., a major consumer loan company in Japan. He is the eldest son of Masao Kinoshita, founder of 
Acom. 
He graduated from Ritsumeikan University with a bachelor's degree.

See also 
 List of billionaires

References

External links 
 Forbes.com: Forbes World's Richest People
 Acom (in English)

1941 births
Living people
Japanese billionaires
Ritsumeikan University alumni
20th-century Japanese businesspeople
21st-century Japanese businesspeople